Sofia Landon Geier (born January 24, 1949) is a television soap opera writer and actress. She is also credited as Sofia Landon or Sophia Landon.

Born in Canada, Geier grew up in Mt. Prospect, Illinois, the child of a commercial artist and a bank legal secretary. In her freshman year of high school, she auditioned for a role in the play Laura. Classmates included Barbara Rucker and Bruce Boxleitner, which whom she performed with numerous times. She studied theatre at Northwestern University.

After college, Geier appeared on television series such as The Rookies, Marcus Welby, M.D. and Medical Center before landing her major role on Guiding Light in 1978. Other early work include the film Murph the Surf directed by Marvin Chomsky as well as off-Broadway roles in The Red, White and Black, Heardbreak House, and Missouri Legend. Her performance in Peg O' My Heart garnered a Drama Desk nomination for best actress in 1977.

Geier was a founding company member of Lexington Conservatory Theatre in Lexington, New York, run by Artistic Director Oakley Hall III along with Executive Director Michael Van Landingham. She continued to work with the company as it moved to Albany, New York and became Capital Repertory Theatre, appearing in its inaugural production of George M. Cohan's The Tavern in 1980, as well Peter Nichols' Joe Egg later that year.

She was married to Michael Van Landingham from 1977 to 1982.

Acting jobs
Another World
 Jennifer Thatcher (1983)
 Donna Love (1990–1991; 1993)

Guiding Light
 Diane Ballard (1978–1981)

Tales from the Darkside 3rd Season
 May Dusa (1986) from the episode, "Miss May Dusa."

Writing jobs

Another World
 Script Writer (1994-1999)

As the World Turns
 Script Writer (1991 - 1992)

Days of Our Lives
 Script Writer (1999 - January 26, 2007)

Awards and nominations
Daytime Emmy Award
Nomination, 1996, Best Writing, Another World

Writers Guild of America Award
Nomination, 2001, Best Writing, Days of our Lives
Win, 1999, Best Writing, Days of our Lives
Nomination, 1994, 1995, 1997, Best Writing, Another World

References

External links

1949 births
Actresses from Montreal
American soap opera writers
Living people
American soap opera actresses
American women television writers
Writers Guild of America Award winners
Women soap opera writers
Writers from Montreal
21st-century American women